Sipapu Ski & Summer Resort, also known simply as Sipapu, is a moderately sized ski resort in Taos County, New Mexico. It is home to New Mexico's longest ski season, from November to April. There are 41 trails and 6 lifts. Other facilities include 4 terrain parks, golf, fishing, lodge accommodations and restaurants. It is located in the Carson National Forest, about 20 miles south-southeast of Taos, New Mexico.

External links

References

Ski areas and resorts in New Mexico
Tourist attractions in Taos County, New Mexico